Nowe Objezierze  is a village in the administrative district of Gmina Moryń, within Gryfino County, West Pomeranian Voivodeship, in north-western Poland.

References

Nowe Objezierze